The Hohenlychen Sanatorium was a complex of sanatoriums in Lychen, Uckermark district (a bit north of Berlin), Germany, that was in use from 1902 to 1945. The complex was originally built in 1902 to house tubercular children. By the 1930s the Hohenlychen Sanatorium had become one of the main medical facilities of the Schutzstaffel, where injured or convalescing SS-men were treated.

Third Reich use

Many preeminent SS doctors trained or were stationed at Hohenlychen, the most infamous being SS-Gruppenführer Doctor Karl Gebhardt, who was sentenced to death for war crimes. In 1935, Gebhardt was appointed Medical Superintendent of Hohenlychen Sanatorium, which he changed from a sanatorium for tuberculosis patients into an orthopedic clinic. At Hohenlychen Sanatorium, Gebhardt started the first sports medicine clinic in Germany and developed sports programs for amputees and other disabled people. Gebhardt was also appointed to the Deutsche Hochschule für Leibesübungen (German College for Physical Education) in 1935, where he became the first professor of sports medicine in Berlin. Hohenlychen Sanatorium became the sports sanatorium for the Third Reich and served as the central hospital for the athletes who participated in the 1936 Summer Olympics. In the final days of the Third Reich, April 1945, Reichsführer-SS Heinrich Himmler left Berlin for Hohenlychen.

After World War II

The German military evacuated Hohenlychen before the Red Army arrived on April 29, 1945. Some of the buildings were used as barracks, and the other buildings were utilized as a military hospital until August 31, 1993. Hohenlychen is now abandoned except for infrequent visits by photographers and tourists.

After 2005 

Michael Neumann, an engineer from Freiberg, bought part of the site - nine buildings on 12 hectares - from the state of Brandenburg in 2009. Neumann then developed a concept for a Parkresidenz Lychen. In his spirit - he died in 2019 - his daughter Anne Neumann continued to operate these plans with her life partner Gregory Kashkin and relatives. There are now 44 barrier-free rental apartments there, almost all of which have already been occupied, as well as ten vacation apartments and a bistro. 40 percent of the listed building fabric has already been renovated. More vacation homes and 15 rental apartments are to be added in the coming year.

In literature
In the Prix Goncourt winning novel, Les Bienveillantes, the Hohenlychen Sanatorium was the location of the protagonist Maximilian Aue's hospitalisation after having been shot in the head at Stalingrad.

References

Sources
Hans Waltrich. Aufstieg und Niedergang der Heilanstalten Hohenlychen (1902 bis 1945). Strelitzia, Blankensee Press, 2001.

External links
Hohenlychen Sanatorium and its hidden history of human experiments

Hospital buildings completed in 1902
Tuberculosis sanatoria in Germany
Medical and health organisations based in Brandenburg
Uckermark (district)